The Medfield Public Schools is the public school district for Medfield, Massachusetts, part of Norfolk County. The district has a total of five schools: three elementary schools, one middle school, and one high school.

Schools

The district has a total of five schools: three elementary schools, one middle school, and one high school.

History

Academics

The Medfield School District continually ranks among the top ten school systems in the Massachusetts Comprehensive Assessment System (MCAS).

References

Education in Norfolk County, Massachusetts
School districts in Massachusetts